The Saint Ann Roman Catholic Church and Rectory is located at 704 Jefferson Street in the City of Hoboken in Hudson County, New Jersey. It was constructed during the tenure of Rev. Michael Gori, who was pastor of the parish from 1921 to 1937. It was added to the National Register of Historic Places on November 24, 2015, for its significance in architecture, religion, and ethnic heritage from 1925 to 1949.

History and description
The church was designed by the Italian-American architect Anton Louis Vegliante using Renaissance Revival style. It was built from 1925 to 1927 by Louis Infante and Son using yellow brick with stone details. The four-story bell tower on the southwest corner is a city landmark and features four cast bronze bells, dedicated to St. Ann, St. Anthony of Padua, St. Francis, and the Immaculate Conception. The interior of the church was decorated by the ecclesiastical artist, Gonippo G. Raggi, and includes paintings, statuary, and stained glass windows. Raggi also decorated the Saint Mary of Mount Virgin Roman Catholic Church in New Brunswick.

See also
National Register of Historic Places listings in Hudson County, New Jersey
List of churches in the Roman Catholic Archdiocese of Newark

References

Churches in Hoboken, New Jersey
Roman Catholic churches in New Jersey
Renaissance Revival architecture in New Jersey
National Register of Historic Places in Hudson County, New Jersey
Churches on the National Register of Historic Places in New Jersey
Roman Catholic churches completed in 1927
Brick buildings and structures
New Jersey Register of Historic Places